= Dirt track racing in South Africa =

Type of auto racing performed on oval tracks in South Africa

Dirt track racing is a type of auto racing performed on oval tracks in South Africa. Dirt track racing classes are, as elsewhere, similar to those raced at the tar (asphalt) oval track racing venues. The dirt track classes include Hot Rods, 1600 Modified Saloons, Modified Non-contact Saloons, V8 American Saloons, and Midgets.
